Alfarata is a census-designated place located in Decatur Township, Mifflin County in the state of Pennsylvania, United States.  It is located along U.S. Route 522 in eastern Mifflin County.  As of the 2010 census,  the population was 149 residents. The community was named for the Indian girl Alfarata from the song "The Blue Juniata".

Demographics

References

Census-designated places in Mifflin County, Pennsylvania
Census-designated places in Pennsylvania